A leadership election for Christian and Democratic Union – Czechoslovak People's Party (KDU-ČSL) was held on 27 May 2001. The incumbent leader Jan Kasal was defeated by Cyril Svoboda.

Voting

159 votes were required to win the election. No candidate received enough votes and second round was held. Svoboda received 162 votes and became the new leader.

References

KDU-ČSL leadership elections
2001 elections in the Czech Republic
Indirect elections
Christian and Democratic Union - Czechoslovak People's Party leadership election